Giovanni Aguilar Calixtro (born June 27, 2000) is an American professional soccer player who plays as a forward for USL League One club FC Tucson.

Career
Born in Cornelius, Oregon, Calixtro was part of Westside Timbers before joining the Portland Timbers youth academy. He made his professional debut for Portland Timbers 2, the club's reserve team, on June 11, 2017 against Real Monarchs. He came on as a 83rd–minute substitute for Villyan Bijev. Calixtro then scored his first professional goal in his first start a month later on July 23 against Reno 1868 in a 1−1 draw. He became the youngest player in T2 history to score 2 goals in a game (18 years, 9 months, 3 days) on March 30, 2019 against LA Galaxy II.

FC Tucson
On March 10, 2021, Calixtro joined USL League One club FC Tucson. He made his debut for the club on May 1 against South Georgia Tormenta, starting in the 3–1 defeat.

Career statistics

References

External links 
 USL Championship profile.

2000 births
Living people
People from Cornelius, Oregon
American soccer players
American people of Basque descent
Portland Timbers 2 players
FC Tucson players
Association football forwards
Soccer players from Oregon
USL Championship players
USL League One players